Stop Search Seize is a 20-part Irish television programme that was shown on Sky1 from 1 September 2015, concerning the work of the Irish Revenue and Customs service at Irelands’ airports, sea ports, and postal sorting offices.

It was also broadcast on the New Zealand television channel Bravo.

References

External links
 

2015 British television series debuts
2010s British documentary television series
Aviation television series
Sky UK original programming
English-language television shows
Television shows set in the Republic of Ireland